The Lost World: Jurassic Park is a 1997 American science fiction action film. It is the second installment in the Jurassic Park franchise and the second film in the original Jurassic Park trilogy. A sequel to 1993's Jurassic Park and loosely based on Michael Crichton's 1995 novel The Lost World, the film was directed by Steven Spielberg from a screenplay by David Koepp. The film stars Jeff Goldblum, returning as the eccentric chaos theorist and mathematician Ian Malcolm, as well as Julianne Moore, Pete Postlethwaite, Arliss Howard, Vince Vaughn, and Vanessa Lee Chester.

Four years after the original film, John Hammond (Richard Attenborough) has lost control of his company InGen to his nephew, Peter Ludlow (Howard). On the verge of bankruptcy, Ludlow intends to exploit dinosaurs from InGen's second island, Isla Sorna, with plans for a new dinosaur theme park in San Diego. Hammond sends a team, led by Malcolm, to the island to document the dinosaurs and encourage non-interference, although the two groups eventually come into conflict.

After the original novel's release and the first film's success, fans pressured Crichton for a sequel. Following the book's publication in 1995, production began on a film sequel. Filming took place from September to December 1996, primarily in California, with a shoot in Kauai, Hawaii, where the first film was shot. The Lost Worlds plot and imagery is substantially darker than Jurassic Park. It makes more extensive use of computer-generated imagery to depict the dinosaurs, along with life-sized animatronics.

The Lost World was among the most anticipated films of 1997. It was accompanied by a $250 million marketing campaign, which included video games, comic books, and toys. Released on May 23, 1997, the film received mixed reviews from critics, who praised the visual effects but criticized the character development. Spielberg also expressed disappointment with the film, stating he had become increasingly disenchanted with it during production. The film grossed $618 million worldwide, becoming the second-highest-grossing film of 1997. It earned an Academy Award nomination for Best Visual Effects, losing to Titanic. A sequel, Jurassic Park III, was released in 2001.

Plot

Four years after the events on Isla Nublar, a wealthy family docks their yacht ashore at the nearby Isla Sorna, unaware that the island contains genetically engineered dinosaurs. Their daughter wanders off and is attacked by a group of Compsognathus, but survives.

An ailing Dr. John Hammond invites mathematician Dr. Ian Malcolm to his residence to discuss the incident. Hammond's company InGen, which created the dinosaurs, is now headed by Hammond's nephew Peter Ludlow, who used the incident to take control of the company from Hammond. Besides Isla Nublar, Ian learns that InGen had another facility, "Site B", on Isla Sorna, where the company's dinosaurs were cloned. However, the island was abandoned during a hurricane four years earlier, and the animals were released into the wild to fend for themselves. Ludlow wants to exploit the island's creatures to save InGen from bankruptcy. Hammond asks Ian to join a team who will document the dinosaurs in their natural habitat, to encourage a policy of non-interference. Ian's girlfriend, paleontologist Dr. Sarah Harding, was hired and is already on Isla Sorna. Upon hearing this, Ian reluctantly agrees to go to the island, but only to retrieve Sarah.

Ian travels there with Eddie Carr, an equipment specialist and engineer, and Nick Van Owen, a video documentarian and activist. They find Sarah, but she insists on staying to continue her research. Ian is shocked when he discovers that his daughter Kelly has stowed away with the team in a trailer, which serves as their mobile base. Ludlow and a mercenary team arrive on the island to capture dinosaurs, with help from big-game hunters Roland Tembo and Ajay Sidhu, Roland's second-in-command Dieter Stark, and paleontologist Dr. Robert Burke.

Malcolm's group realizes Ludlow intends to ship the captured specimens to San Diego, for an unfinished Jurassic Park attraction that he plans to revive. Hammond had abandoned the San Diego project in favor of the park on Isla Nublar. Nick and Sarah free the captured dinosaurs, and the animals wreak havoc on the InGen team's camp. On the way back to the trailer, Nick rescues an injured Tyrannosaurus rex infant that Roland used as bait to hunt its father. Nick and Sarah treat the infant's broken leg, but the Tyrannosaurus adults arrive, having tracked the infant's scent. They reclaim their infant, destroy the trailer, and devour Eddie during his attempt to rescue the group.

Ian, Sarah, Nick, and Kelly are rescued by Ludlow's team and are forced to work together after losing all their communications equipment. They decide to travel to an abandoned InGen base to call for help. During a break, Stark goes into the wilderness alone to relieve himself and is killed by a group of Compsognathus. After the team sets up a camp for the night, they are ambushed by the Tyrannosaurus adults: Burke is devoured, and others flee into a field of long grass where a pack of Velociraptors ambush them, killing Ajay and most of the InGen personnel.

Ian, Sarah, Kelly, and Nick reach the InGen base, fight off Velociraptors, and successfully radio for helicopter extraction. After being rescued, Nick reveals that he stole Roland's ammunition, to prevent him from killing his trophy. However, they learn Roland has sedated the male Tyrannosaurus with tranquilizers instead. As more InGen personnel arrive on the island to secure the male and infant, Roland declines Ludlow's job offer at the San Diego park, reflecting on Ajay's death and the morality of Ludlow's scheme.

In San Diego, Ian and Sarah attempt to convince Ludlow to abandon his plans, but the ship carrying the male Tyrannosaurus suddenly crashes into the docks. The crew is found dead, and the Tyrannosaurus is accidentally released and begins rampaging through the city. Ian and Sarah locate the infant at the planned park and use it to lure the male back to the docks. Ludlow tries to retrieve the infant within the cargo hold, but is injured by the adult, before being mauled to death by the infant. Sarah uses a tranquilizer gun to sedate the male, before intervening government forces can use lethal force on it, while Ian seals the cargo hold doors.

In the aftermath, the dinosaurs are shipped back to Isla Sorna accompanied by a naval escort, while Ian, Sarah, and Kelly watch Hammond in a televised interview announce that the American and Costa Rican governments have declared the island a nature preserve.

Cast

Production

Pre-production
After the release of the novel, Jurassic Park in 1990, Michael Crichton was pressured by fans for a sequel. Having never written one, he initially refused. While shooting the novel's film adaptation, director Steven Spielberg believed that if a sequel were made, it would involve the retrieval of the canister that contained dinosaur DNA lost during the events of the first film. Talk of a sequel film began after the 1993 release of Jurassic Park, which was a financial success. Spielberg held discussions with David Koepp and Crichton, who wrote the previous film, to talk about possible ideas for a sequel. The production schedule for a second Jurassic Park film was dependent on whether Crichton would write a sequel to the first novel.

In March 1994, Crichton said there would probably be a sequel to both the novel and film, saying he had a story idea for another novel, which would then be adapted into a film. At the time, Spielberg had not committed to directing the new novel's film adaptation, as he planned to take a year off from directing. In March 1995, Crichton said that he was nearly finished writing the sequel, scheduled for release later that year, although he declined to specify its title or plot. At the time of this announcement, Spielberg had signed on to produce the film adaptation, with filming to begin in summer 1996 for release in 1997. Spielberg was busy with his new DreamWorks studio and had not decided if he would direct the film, saying, "I'd love to direct it, but I just have to see. My life is changing".

A production team was assembled in spring 1995, as Crichton was finishing the second novel, titled The Lost World; simultaneously, Spielberg and Koepp were developing ideas for the screenplay. Crichton's novel was published that September, while Spielberg was announced as director for the film adaptation in November. Spielberg and Crichton agreed to forego upfront fees for a share of the back-end. Koepp's deal was said to be the most lucrative for an adaptation at the time, with a fee in the region of $1.5 to $2 million. Joe Johnston, who offered to direct the film adaptation, eventually directed the following film, Jurassic Park III (2001). The Lost World: Jurassic Park had nearly 1,500 storyboards, which aided in the precise planning needed to shoot scenes involving action, dinosaurs, and special-effects.

Writing
The plot for Crichton's Lost World novel involves a second island with dinosaurs but no reference to the canister of dinosaur DNA, which was later used as a plot aspect in a rejected early draft for Jurassic Park IV. After the film adaptation of The Lost World was announced, Koepp received letters of advice from children who were interested in the film. According to Koepp, one letter read: "As long as you have the T. rex and the Velociraptor, everything else is fine. But, whatever you do, don't have a long boring part at the beginning that has nothing to do with the island". Koepp retained the letter as "sort of a reminder". Koepp also took a suggestion from the letter to add Stegosaurus into the script.

After the novel was finished, Crichton was not consulted about the sequel film, and it was not until he declined to approve certain merchandising rights that he received a copy of the script. Kathleen Kennedy, the film's executive producer, and producer of Jurassic Park, said: "In the same way Michael doesn't see writing as a collaboration, Steven went off and did his own movie. When Michael turned the book over to Steven, he knew his work was finished". By the time Crichton had finished his novel, Spielberg and Koepp had already been discussing ideas for the film for more than a year. For the adaptation, Koepp attempted to combine the ideas that he and Spielberg devised along with those from Crichton's novel. Spielberg said that the middle portion of the novel was lacking in story narrative, but that Crichton's set-up was excellent, and he put Spielberg and his crew on the right road. Koepp had a year to write the script before the start of filming.

To prepare before writing the script, Spielberg was more insistent that Koepp watch the 1925 film, The Lost World, than he was on having him read Crichton's novel, which Koepp also did. During an early meeting with Koepp, Spielberg determined that while the primary conflict of the original film involved herbivorous dinosaurs vs. carnivorous dinosaurs, the script for the new film should involve humans who are "gatherers" (observers of the dinosaurs) and "hunters" (who capture the dinosaurs for a zoo). Koepp said the plot of the 1962 film Hatari! – about African animals being captured for zoos – had "a big influence" on The Lost Worlds script.

Spielberg and Koepp discarded many of the novel's scenes and ideas, choosing instead to devise a new story while including the two ideas from the novel that Spielberg liked: a second island populated with dinosaurs, and a scene where half of a two-part trailer dangles from a cliff after being attacked by T. rexes. Also retained was the idea of parenting and nurturing behavior among dinosaurs, as well as a baby T. rex and a child who stows away in the trailer. The character of Robert Burke is based on paleontologist Robert Bakker, who believes that T. rex was a predator. Rival paleontologist Jack Horner, the film's technical advisor, viewed the dinosaur as being protective and not inherently aggressive. Horner requested that the character of Burke be eaten by the T. rex, although Bakker enjoyed the scene and believed that it vindicated his theory that T. rex was a predator.

Crichton's novel revolves around Malcolm's team and a rival team led by InGen's corporate rival, Biosyn, which was written out of the film adaptation in favor of two competing InGen teams. Several characters from the novel were excluded from the film adaptation, including Lewis Dodgson, the leader of the Biosyn team, and field equipment engineer Doc Thorne, whose characteristics were partially implemented in the film's version of Eddie. Two new characters not featured in the novel were Nick and Roland. For these characters, Koepp chose the surnames Tembo and Van Owen as a reference to one of his favorite songs, "Roland the Headless Thompson Gunner", by Warren Zevon. Koepp said "since Roland is a mercenary in the song, that seemed like a good name for the hunter-for-hire in our movie. While I was at it, I thought it would be fun to make his nemesis' last name Van Owen, like in the song". Spielberg regretted excluding a scene from the script that would have depicted characters on motorcycles attempting to flee raptors, similar to a sequence in the novel. An alternate version of the scene was added to the 2015 film, Jurassic World.

While Crichton's novel featured two child characters, Kelly and Arby, Koepp combined them into a single character also named Kelly. Arby is a black character, and black actress Vanessa Lee Chester was chosen to play Kelly in the film. Initially, Kelly was to be a student of Ian Malcolm's, although Koepp had difficulty making this idea work, saying that Malcolm "would never teach grade school, so I thought maybe he was tutoring her. Why? Maybe he got a drunk driving ticket, and he had to do community service, so he's tutoring at this inner-city high school". Koepp scrapped this idea because of its similarity to the 1995 film Dangerous Minds. Because the film would deal with dinosaur nurturing, Koepp realized that the parenting element should also extend to the human characters. Spielberg approved Koepp's idea to have Kelly as Malcolm's daughter, although they initially were unsure about a black actress playing the daughter of a white parent. Spielberg has two adopted black children, and he and Koepp soon decided to retain the idea. Koepp wanted to write an explanation into the script about the discrepancy in skin color, but he dropped this idea as he could not think of a way to address it in a simple manner.

Koepp referred to Crichton's original Jurassic Park novel for some scenes that would be added into the film adaptation of The Lost World. Dieter's death scene was inspired by John Hammond's death in the first novel, where Procompsognathus kill him. The film's opening scene came from an early chapter in the first novel that was not used in the film adaptation, where a Procompsognathus bites a girl on a beach. The first novel also included a scene where characters hide behind a waterfall from a T. rex; this scene was not used in the first film but was added into The Lost World: Jurassic Park, for the scene in which the T. rex eats Burke.

Early scripts had featured two Pteranodon sequences, including one in which Malcolm and his group would escape raptors by hang-gliding off a cliff, only to encounter a Pteranodon. Another sequence, once planned as the film's ending, involved an aerial battle where Pteranodons attack the helicopter trying to escape Isla Sorna. Spielberg also considered having the Pteranodons swoop down and carry off humans and animals in their large beaks, an idea that was rejected by Horner. This version of the story featured a larger worker's village on the island, whereas the final version of the village was only a quarter of what was initially designed. For more than a year, Spielberg and Koepp were unsure whether to include a scene involving a dinosaur in a city. Koepp believed that such a scene would only work for a short period of time before becoming unbelievable.

Weeks before filming began, Spielberg decided to change the ending to have the T. rex rampage through San Diego. He was interested in seeing dinosaurs attacking the mainland, and he believed that audiences would enjoy the San Diego rampage. Initially, Spielberg wanted such a scene to be saved for a third film but later decided to add it to the second one when he realized he would probably not direct another film in the series. The sequence is similar to an attack scene involving a Brontosaurus in London in the 1925 version of The Lost World, adapted from Sir Arthur Conan Doyle's 1912 novel of the same name, both of which inspired the title for Crichton's novel. For the rampage sequence, Spielberg referenced monster films such as The Beast from 20,000 Fathoms and Gorgo. Koepp's first draft of the new third act was completed a week after talking with Spielberg, although it would continue to go through revisions. Koepp wrote a total of nine drafts for the film. Producers Colin Wilson and Gerald Molen wanted the Pteranodons to remain in the story, but the creatures ultimately received only a small appearance in the film's ending shot.

Casting
In November 1994, Richard Attenborough said he would reprise his role as John Hammond from the first film. In 1995, Spielberg met Vanessa Lee Chester at the premiere of A Little Princess, in which she appeared. Chester later recalled: "As I was signing an autograph for him, he told me one day he'd put me in a film". Spielberg met with Chester the following year to discuss The Lost World: Jurassic Park before ultimately casting her as Malcolm's daughter, Kelly. Pete Postlethwaite was cast after Spielberg saw his performance in the 1993 film In the Name of the Father. Art Malik turned down a role in the film.

In April 1996, Julianne Moore was in discussions to star in the film alongside Jeff Goldblum. Spielberg had admired Moore's performance in The Fugitive. Two months later, Peter Stormare was in final negotiations to join the cast. Later in August, Vince Vaughn joined the cast. Spielberg was impressed with Vaughn's performance in the film Swingers, which he saw after the filmmakers asked his permission to use music from his earlier film, Jaws. After meeting with Spielberg, Vaughn was cast without having to do a screen test. Indian actor M. R. Gopakumar was initially cast as Ajay Sidhu in August 1996, but was unable to participate in the project because of trouble acquiring a work visa in time for filming. He was one of six people considered for the role, which ultimately went to actor Harvey Jason.

Filming

Production designer Rick Carter traveled to Hawaii, then Puerto Rico, New Zealand, and Australia to scout possible filming locations. Costa Rica and South America were never considered, as filming would have taken place during the local area's rainy season. However, the film ultimately did use tropical sound effects that were recorded in Costa Rica. By February 1996, northern New Zealand had been chosen as a filming location. While the first film had been shot in Kauai, Hawaii, the filmmakers wanted to shoot the sequel in a different location with new scenery. New Zealand was also chosen because it was believed to better represent a real dinosaur environment, although Crichton wanted the film to be shot on Kauai.

In August 1996, Humboldt County, California was chosen instead of New Zealand, where filming would have been too costly. Humboldt County offered financial incentives that would keep the film's production costs lower. Oregon had been considered before Humboldt County was chosen. Filming locations in Humboldt County would include the redwood forests of Eureka, California. This location was picked because research indicated dinosaurs did not inhabit tropical habitats, but forests like the ones in Eureka.

Filming began on September 5, 1996, at Fern Canyon, part of California's Prairie Creek Redwoods State Park. Production continued in northern California for two weeks at locations such as Eureka, Sue-meg State Park, and private property in Fieldbrook. Filming in Humboldt County concluded on September 19. Throughout the fall of 1996, filming continued on sound stages at Universal Studios Hollywood. The Site B workers village was also constructed there and left intact after filming to become a part of the theme park tour. Because of limited stage space in Hollywood, the production crew had to alternate between the different stages at Universal, with stages being redecorated when not in use to prepare for future filming.

A 1997 Fleetwood Southwind Storm RV was used to depict the mobile trailer lab. Several trailers were created for filming. Scenes involving the trailer lab were shot in Eureka, followed by filming at Universal. For shots in which half of the trailer dangles from a cliff, a whole mountainside was built over the structure of Universal's parking garage, and the trailer was dangled against the mountainside using a 95-ton crane. Before the trailer is shoved off the cliff, it is attacked by the T. rex adults who slam their heads into the vehicle. Animatronic versions of the adults were used for this scene, and the damage to the trailer was authentically caused by the animatronics rather than through computer effects. Shots involving both the animatronic T. rexes and the trailer together were filmed on Universal's Stage 24. Other shots involving the trailer were filmed on Stage 27.

A portion of the trailer scene was filmed in a continuous take using a  crane arm. The camera would track actor Richard Schiff as his character travels through part of the trailer to throw rope down to the other characters, who are stuck in the other portion of the trailer as it dangles over the side of the cliff. This shot required precise timing to get right, and a dolly track also had to be built into the stage. While filming inside the trailer, the camera would lose focus because of interference from some piece of the electronic equipment inside the vehicle. After 15 failed takes, the film crew was close to giving up on the shot, until a remote-focus mechanism was mounted onto the camera. Ultimately, the film crew managed to get three good takes over the course of nine hours. Another issue resulted from the scene taking place during a storm, as the artificial rain fogged the camera lens, and the camera's rain deflectors failed.

Spielberg did not allow for cast rehearsals: "You want to capture the actors when they taste the words for the first time, when they look at each other for the first time – that's the sort of magic you can only get on a first or second take". Spielberg wanted his long-time cinematographer Dean Cundey to return for The Lost World after working on the previous film, although Cundey was busy preparing to direct Honey, We Shrunk Ourselves, so Spielberg chose Janusz Kamiński instead. Kamiński had worked with Spielberg on Schindler's List, and he gave The Lost World a darker, more artistic look over its predecessor, leading to a "more elegant and rich" approach focused on contrast and shadow. Much of the film takes place at night, and Kamiński looked at the films Alien and Blade Runner for visual reference. Koepp was the film's second unit director, having volunteered for the position in hopes of gaining more directorial experience. Second unit work consisted of establishing shots, such as people marching across Isla Sorna, and helicopter shots. When Spielberg was unavailable for filming because of a family commitment in New York, Koepp also took over the first unit for eight days of filming, during the shoot at Universal's sound stages. Spielberg monitored the filming process through satellite video in New York during his week off.

The InGen hunters' base camp was constructed on Stage 12. On Stage 23, a large ravine was constructed for a scene in which a T. rex chases characters into a small cave hidden behind a waterfall. Special-effects expert Michael Lantieri constructed the artificial waterfall, and the scene was shot using a Steadicam. Spielberg estimated that nearly half of the film was shot using Steadicam, as it was useful for the film's abundance of chase scenes. For the scene in which raptors attack the InGen team in a field of long grass, Lantieri and a team started growing real grass a year earlier on eight acres, located in Newhall, California. The acreage allowed for any potential reshoots to be done, as any grass that was flattened during filming would not come back up. The scene was filmed in early November 1996.

The T. rex rampage through San Diego was also filmed during November. Although the sequence takes place in San Diego, only one scene was shot there. In it, an InGen helicopter flies over the wharf and banks towards the city. The other sequences were all shot in Burbank, California. An eight-scale dock and miniature ship were created for the scene in which the T. rex arrives in San Diego. One scene has the T. rex ramming into a driving bus which then crashes into a Blockbuster Video. The video store was built as a set on an empty lot in Burbank. The San Diego scenes were shot behind barricades to maintain secrecy; Spielberg noted that "it looked like road-repair work was going on". Various members of the film crew were featured running from the Tyrannosaurus, with Koepp credited as the "Unlucky Bastard" who is eaten during a scene set in San Diego. Scenes involving Hammond's residence were shot during the final week of filming, at Mayfield Senior School in Pasadena, California. A scene where Vaughn's character emerges from a lake was also shot in Pasadena.

Originally, filming was to take place over five days in December at New Zealand's Fiordland National Park, where the film's opening sequence was to be shot. In early December, plans to film in Fiordland were abruptly cancelled. Principal photography concluded ahead of schedule on December 11. However, in mid-December 1996, plans were approved to shoot the opening sequence on a beach in Kauai after the cancellation of the New Zealand shoot. Filming in Kauai was underway on December 20, with plans to finish two days later. Although Spielberg was in Kauai at the time, and had visited the production, the opening sequence was filmed by a second unit crew. The film was shot on a budget of $73 million.

Creatures on screen

While Jurassic Park featured mostly the animatronic dinosaurs built by Stan Winston's team, The Lost World relied more on the computer-generated imagery (CGI) of Industrial Light & Magic (ILM). This meant the film featured larger shots that offered plenty of space for the digital artists to add the dinosaurs. The film features 75 computer-generated shots. A scene in which the hunters round up a group of dinosaurs was made almost entirely with computer-generated creatures. An exception was a handful of Pachycephalosaurus shots.

Spielberg followed Horner's advice to help keep the dinosaurs scientifically accurate for the most part, with some exceptions. The Winston design team closely modelled the dinosaurs based on paleontological facts, or theories in certain cases where facts were not definitively known. In addition to animatronics, Winston's team also painted maquettes of dinosaurs that would subsequently be created through CGI. ILM animators went to Six Flags Discovery Kingdom, then known as Marine World/Africa USA to videotape elephants, reptiles, and rhinos, to determine how to make the dinosaurs appear more like living animals. Although technology had not advanced much since the release of the first film, Spielberg noted that "the artistry of the creative computer people" had advanced: "There's better detail, much better lighting, better muscle tone and movement in the animals. When a dinosaur transfers weight from his left side to his right, the whole movement of fat and sinew is smoother, more physiologically correct". All of the dinosaurs used servo control for facial movements.

While the first film showed that dinosaurs could be adequately recreated through special effects, the sequel raised the question of what could be done with the dinosaurs. Winston said: "I wanted to show the world what they didn't see in Jurassic Park: more dinosaurs and more dinosaur action. 'More, bigger, better' was our motto". Some of the animatronics cost $1 million and weighed nine and a half tons. Lantieri, the special effects supervisor, said: "The big T. rex robot can pull two Gs of force when it's moving from right to left. If you hit someone with that, you'd kill them. So, in a sense, we did treat the dinosaurs as living, dangerous creatures".
 Compsognathus, nicknamed "Compies" by Winston's crew, are a small carnivorous theropod which attacks in packs. Visual effects supervisor Dennis Muren considered them the most complex digital dinosaur. Their small size meant the Compys had their whole body visible and thus needed a higher sense of gravity and weight. A simple puppet Compsognathus is featured in the opening scene, and the part where Dieter Stark was killed by the pack had Peter Stormare wearing a jacket onto which various rubber Compies were attached. In the film, Burke identifies the dinosaur as Compsognathus triassicus, which in reality is a non-existent species. The name is a combination of Compsognathus longipes and Procompsognathus triassicus.
 Gallimimus is shown fleeing from the InGen Hunters.
 Mamenchisaurus is shown on the game trail scene. The Brachiosaurus model from the first film was altered to portray the Mamenchisaurus, which was fully computer-generated.
 Pachycephalosaurus, a dinosaur standing five feet tall and measuring eight feet long. Three versions of the creature were created for filming: a full hydraulic puppet, a head, and a head-butter. The latter was built to withstand high impact for a scene in which the dinosaur head-butts one of the hunter vehicles. The Pachycephalosaurus puppet, one of the most complex, was used for a scene in which the dinosaur is captured. The legs of the puppet were controlled through pneumatics.
 Parasaurolophus is shown being hunted down by the InGen hunters. Winston's team was to create a puppet version of the animal for this scene, but ILM ultimately created the animal through CGI instead, basing the design off of a miniature sculpture that Winston's team had created. In addition, an earlier opening scene that was scrapped would have featured a Japanese fishing trawler acquiring a partially decomposed Parasaurolophus in its net, which would break from the weight, allowing the body to sink back into the ocean. Winston's team created a practical Parasaurolophus for the scene before it was scrapped, although the carcass was still used for a scene set in a T. rex nest.
 Stegosaurus was, according to Spielberg, included "by popular demand". Winston's team built full-sized versions of both the infant and adult Stegosaurus, but Spielberg eventually opted to employ a digital version for the adults so they could be more mobile. It was shipped to the redwood forest for on-site filming. Although they were also brought to the forest for filming, they ultimately were not used because of mobility issues and safety concerns. A full-sized Stegosaurus is only shown in a brief shot, in which the animal is caged.
 Triceratops is shown being hunted down by the InGen hunters. A baby Triceratops was also created by Winston's team, for a shot depicting the animal in a cage. A baby Triceratops had previously been planned for the first film, before being scrapped.
 Tyrannosaurus is featured as a family, with two adults and an infant. The T. rex animatronic from the first film was used for The Lost World as well, and Winston and his team also built a second adult T. rex for the sequel. Featuring two practical T. rexes required double the work and puppeteers. The adult T. rex animatronics were built from head to mid-body, while full body shots were created through CGI. The animatronics weighed nine tons each and cost $1 million apiece. For the mobile trailer sequence, an  track was built into the sound stage floor, allowing the T. rexes to be moved backward and forward. The adult T. rexes could not be moved from their location at Stage 24, so new sets had to be built around the animatronics as filming progressed. Animatronics were primarily used for the scene in which the T. rexes kill Eddie, with the exception of two CGI shots: when the animals emerge from the forest and when they tear Eddie's body in half. Otherwise, the animatronics were used for shots in which the animals tear the vehicle apart to get to Eddie. Filming the scene with the animatronics required close collaboration with a stunt coordinator. An animatronic T. rex was also used in scenes depicting the deaths of Burke and Ludlow.
 The baby T. rex had two different practical versions, a "fully contained" remote controlled version the actors could carry, and a hybrid operated by both hydraulics and cables which lay on the operating table, and had the added complexity of moving as Vince Vaughn held its head.
 Velociraptor had a mechanical version which depicted the upper half of its body, and a digital full-motion computer raptor. A "super-raptor" had also been considered for the film, but Spielberg rejected it, saying it was "a little too much out of a horror movie. I didn't want to create an alien".
 Pteranodon makes an appearance at the film's end.

Music

For the sequel, composer John Williams avoided using most of the previous film's main themes, writing a more action-oriented score. The soundtrack was released on May 20, 1997. It, along with the soundtrack to the first movie, was re-released and remastered on November 29, 2016.

Marketing

In February 1997, Universal announced a $250 million marketing campaign with 70 promotional partners. It was even more extensive than that of Jurassic Park. The leading partners were Burger King, whose promotion was concurrent with one for another Universal dinosaur-based franchise, The Land Before Time; JVC and Mercedes-Benz, whose products are featured in the movie; and Timberland Co., making its first film tie-in. Another partner was a then-sister company of Universal under Seagram, Tropicana Products. Other promotional partners included Hamburger Helper and Betty Crocker, while General Mills introduced Jurassic Park Crunch cereal. Derivative works included various video games, including both a pinball machine and an arcade game by Sega, and a four-part comic series released by Topps Comics.

Other promotional items included a toy line of action figures by Kenner and remote-controlled vehicles by Tyco, as well as a board game by Milton Bradley Company. Also produced were Hershey's chocolate bars that featured holographic dinosaur patterns. Universal hoped for promotional profits to exceed $1 billion. Inspired by how Jurassic Park featured the Ford Explorer, Mercedes-Benz signed an endorsement deal to use the film to introduce its first sports utility vehicle, the W163.

On December 13, 1996, a special version of the film's teaser trailer debuted at 42 theaters in the United States and Canada, at a cost of $14,000 for each theater; the trailer used synchronized strobe lights that mimicked lightning during a rain scene. The film's first trailer was aired on January 26, 1997, during Super Bowl XXXI. A travelling exhibition, The Lost World: The Life and Death of Dinosaurs, went on tour in May 1997, coinciding with the film's release. The exhibit was produced in connection with the film, and its centerpiece was a 70-foot-long recreation of a Mamenchisaurus.

A detailed website for the film was also created, and provided backstory for characters and events not referenced in the film. Shortly after the film's release, hackers broke into the website and briefly changed the film's logo to feature a duck instead of a T. rex. The film's title in the logo was also changed to The Duck World: Jurassic Pond. Universal denied that the hacking was a publicity stunt to promote the film, stating that it was traced to a "16-year-old hacker kid from back East". The website was still online as of 2017.

Release

Theatrical

The Lost World: Jurassic Park premiered on May 19, 1997, at a Cineplex Odeon theater in Universal City, California. The Los Angeles Times called the premiere "low-key". The film opened on May 23, 1997 receiving the widest release for a film to date opening in 3,281 theaters with previews commencing at 10 p.m. the night before. The film expanded to 3,565 theaters in its fourth weekend. It was also the first film to use the 1997-2012 Universal Pictures logo, accompanied by its fanfare by Jerry Goldsmith.

Home media
The Lost World: Jurassic Park made its home video debut on THX certified VHS and LaserDisc releases on November 4, 1997, accompanied by a $50 million promotional campaign.

Fox paid $80 million for the broadcasting rights of The Lost World: Jurassic Park, which debuted on November 1, 1998. The television version was expanded with deleted scenes, that included John Hammond's ouster by InGen executives.

The Lost World: Jurassic Park was released on a Collector's Edition DVD on October 10, 2000, in both Widescreen (1.85:1) and Full Screen (1.33:1) versions, in a box set with its predecessor Jurassic Park. The films were also featured in a deluxe limited edition box set featuring both DVDs, soundtrack albums, two lenticulars, stills from both films, and a certificate of authenticity signed by the set's producers, inside a collector case. After the release of sequel Jurassic Park III, box sets including all three movies were also made available, as Jurassic Park Trilogy on December 11, 2001, and as the Jurassic Park Adventure Pack on November 29, 2005. The Lost World was first made available on Blu-ray on October 25, 2011, as part of a trilogy release. The entire Jurassic Park film series was released on 4K UHD Blu-Ray on May 22, 2018.

Reception

Box office
The Lost World took in $72.1 million on its opening weekend ($92.7 million for the four-day Memorial Day holiday, including $2.6 million from Thursday night previews) in the U.S., which was the biggest opening weekend up to that point, beating Batman Forever. This made it the first film to reach the $70 million mark during an opening weekend. For four and a half years, the film held that record until the release of Harry Potter and the Sorcerer's Stone in November 2001. The film also had the biggest May opening weekend, surpassing the previous records held by Twister and Mission: Impossible. It would hold this record until 2002 when Spider-Man took it. Additionally, it surpassed Mission: Impossible for having the largest Memorial Day weekend gross, as well as three opening records held by Independence Day. In 2004, Shrek 2 broke The Lost Worlds record for having the biggest Memorial Day weekend gross. That film would hold this record for two years until 2006 when it was given to X-Men: The Last Stand, which also took The Lost Worlds record for having the highest Memorial Day opening weekend.

The Lost World broke several other box office records as well. The film made $21.6 million on its Friday opening and $24.4 million on its second day, making it the highest Friday and Saturday grosses. While the Friday record was taken by Toy Story 2 in 1999, the film continued to hold the Saturday record for two more years until The Mummy Returns surpassed it. It also took the record for highest single-day box office take of $26.1 million on May 25, a record held until the release of Star Wars: Episode I – The Phantom Menace in 1999. It became the fastest film to pass the $100 million mark, achieving the feat in just six days. When the film first debuted on May 23, it had the largest number of screenings, playing at 3,281 theaters. This broke the record also held by Mission: Impossible. However, despite these records, its total box office gross fell below the total of the original film. Ticket sales dropped 62% by its second weekend. The film made $34.1 million during its second weekend, making it the fourth-highest-grossing second weekend of all time, after its predecessor, Twister and Independence Day. Over the next few weeks, The Lost World would go on to compete against other blockbuster films released during that summer such as Hercules, Face/Off, Men in Black, Con Air, George of the Jungle, Batman & Robin and Speed 2: Cruise Control. It ultimately grossed $229.1 million in the U.S. and $389.5 million internationally, for a total of $618.6 million worldwide, becoming the second highest-grossing film of 1997 behind Titanic. The film sold an estimated 49,910,000 tickets in North America.

Critical response
On review aggregation website Rotten Tomatoes, the film holds an approval rating of 54% based on 79 reviews and an average rating of 5.6/10. The site's critical consensus reads: "The Lost World demonstrates how far CG effects have come in the four years since Jurassic Park; unfortunately, it also proves how difficult it can be to put together a truly compelling sequel." On Metacritic, the film has a weighted average rating of 59 out of 100, based on 18 critics, indicating "mixed or average reviews". Audiences polled by CinemaScore gave the film an average grade of "B+" on an A+ to F scale.

Roger Ebert, who gave the first film three stars, gave The Lost World only two, writing: "It can be said that the creatures in this film transcend any visible signs of special effects and seem to walk the earth, but the same realism isn't brought to the human characters, who are bound by plot conventions and action formulas". Gene Siskel of the Chicago Tribune also gave the film two stars and said: "I was disappointed as much as I was thrilled because 'The Lost World' lacks a staple of Steven Spielberg's adventure films: exciting characters. [...] Even in the original 'Jurassic Park', the dinosaurs – not to mention the human beings – had more distinct personalities than they have here. Save for superior special effects, 'The Lost World' comes off as recycled material".

Kevin Thomas of the Los Angeles Times saw improved character development over the original: "It seemed such a mistake in Jurassic Park to sideline early on its most interesting character, the brilliant, free-thinking and outspoken theorist Ian Malcolm (Jeff Goldblum) with a broken leg, but in its most inspired stroke, The Lost World brings back Malcolm and places him front and center", calling it "a pleasure to watch such wily pros as Goldblum and Attenborough spar with each other with wit and assurance". Stephen Holden of The New York Times saying, "The Lost World, unlike Jurassic Park, humanizes its monsters in a way that E.T. would understand". Owen Gleiberman of Entertainment Weekly gave the film a B grade; he remarked, "Mr. T-Rex was cool in the first Spielberg flick, sure, but it wasn't until [it was in] San Diego that things got crazy-cool. It's the old 'tree falling in the woods' conundrum: Unless your giant monster is causing massive property damage, can you really call it a giant monster?"

Spielberg said that during production he became increasingly disenchanted with the film:

Spielberg regretted that the film characters are aware they are going to an island of dinosaurs, unlike the previous film. He later said that he knows a major reason why his sequels tend to not live up to the quality of his original films:

Retrospective
Later reviews have also been mixed. Critic Tim Brayton described it as "readily the worst thing Steven Spielberg has ever made." In 2015, Matt Goldberg of Collider wrote that the film feels "like the work of a Spielberg protégé. All the beats are in place, but it's an imitation". He considered the film inferior to its predecessor. In 2018, Brian Silliman of Syfy Wire cited the film as a rare example of a film adaptation that is better than its novel counterpart. In particular, he praised the addition of Postlethwaite and his character. However, Syfy Wire's Stephanie Williams considered the novel superior, finding it more action-packed and thrilling while also taking its time "to breathe with these majestic creatures", whereas the film has "way more running and screaming". Bilge Ebiri of Vulture reviewed the film in 2020, praising the horror elements and writing that it "might be Spielberg's nastiest film – a truly demented series of mostly wordless action and horror setpieces whose technical proficiency is matched only by their cruelty". In contrast, Jacob Hall of /Film negatively compared it to Spielberg's 1984 film Indiana Jones and the Temple of Doom, writing that The Lost World transforms "intelligent characters into bumbling idiots", increases "the volume and the chaos while dialing back the mystery and the awe", and replaces "excitement with violence and cruelty".

Accolades

References

External links

 
 Jurassic Park & The Lost World official website
 
 
 
 
 

Jurassic Park films
Films about dinosaurs
Giant monster films
American monster movies
1990s monster movies
1997 films
1990s science fiction adventure films
American chase films
American science fiction adventure films
American sequel films
Eco-terrorism in fiction
Films about animal rights
Films based on works by Michael Crichton
Films set in Costa Rica
Films set in San Diego
Films set on fictional islands
Films shot in Hawaii
Films shot in California
Jungle adventure films
Pterosaurs in fiction
Amblin Entertainment films
Universal Pictures films
Films scored by John Williams
Films directed by Steven Spielberg
Films produced by Gerald R. Molen
Films with screenplays by David Koepp
Films based on American novels
Films based on science fiction novels
Environmental films
1990s English-language films